William Coolahan was an Australian soccer player. He captained Australia in three matches.

Club career
Born in the footballing hotbed of West Wallsend, New South Wales, Coolahan began his playing career with West Wallsend before crossing to Adamstown Rosebud in 1929. He returned to West Wallsend in 1931 though he only stayed one season before crossing to Speers Point. After another stint with West Wallsend in 1933 and 1934, he moved to Adamstown. At Adamstown he played until the end of the 1942 season. He played his final season of senior football in 1943 for Lake Macquarie.

International career
He played seven matches for the New South Wales state team, playing as captain once. Coolahan represented Australia eight times in B international matches. He played three full international matches and was captain in all three matches. Coolahan made his full debut for Australia in Sydney against India in September 1938. He played two further games against India, the last in October 1938.

Career statistics

International

Honours
In 2001 Coolahan was inducted in the Australian Soccer Hall of Fame. He is a member of the Hunter Region Sporting Hall of Fame.

References

Australia international soccer players
Australian soccer players
People from Newcastle, New South Wales
Association football defenders
Year of birth missing
Sportsmen from New South Wales
Soccer players from New South Wales